Walter J. Hood (born 1958, Charlotte, NC) is an American professor and former chair of landscape architecture at the University of California, Berkeley, and principal of Hood Design Studio in Oakland, California. In 2019, Hood was awarded the MacArthur Fellowship, known as the "Genius Grant."

Career 
Hood has worked in a variety of settings including architecture, landscape architecture, art, community and urban design, and planning and research.

Early life 
Hood grew up in Charlotte, North Carolina, and has spent more than 20 years living and working in Oakland, California. He draws on his strong connection to the black community in his work. He has chosen to work almost exclusively in the public realm and urban environments. He went to school at North Carolina A&T State University, receiving a Bachelor of Landscape Architecture in 1981. He has received both his Master of Architecture and Master of Landscape Architecture from the University of California, Berkeley in 1989. He also received his Master of Fine Arts from the School of the Art Institute of Chicago in 2013 in studio arts and sculpture, exploring the role of sculpture and urbanism.

Career 
Hood established Hood Design Studio in Oakland, California in 1992. Hood's work spans the range from local, community-based projects—such as Splash Pad Park, a converted traffic island alongside Interstate 580 in Oakland, California—to large-scale garden designs like the grounds for the new M. H. de Young Museum in San Francisco with Swiss architects Herzog & de Meuron (2005). Hood's public spaces embrace the essence of urban environments and for their links to urban redevelopment and neighborhood revitalization. He is currently designing the landscape for the Autry National Center Southwest Museum in Los Angeles, designing an archeological garden within the context of the South Lawn Project at the University of Virginia, and developing a set of monuments and markers for a six-mile waterfront trail in Oakland, CA.

Hood's published monographs Urban Diaries (Spacemaker Press, 1997) and Blues & Jazz Landscape Improvisations (Poltroon Press, 1993) illustrate his approach to the design of urban landscapes. These works won an ASLA Research award in 1996. His essay "Macon Memories" is included in Sites of Memory: Perspectives on Architecture and Race (Princeton Architectural Press, 2001).

Hood has been praised as a "community whisperer," creating spaces that have elements the residents want before they even know it: "Through his work as an urbanist, Hood has integrated architectural features such as playgrounds, plazas and squares into city sites whose pasts are vibrant but forgotten. By reflecting the shifting cultural composition and respecting the evolving nature of neighborhoods throughout San Francisco and Oakland, he has created an oasis in these areas, and through his close involvement with the local communities, he developed tailored solutions for Bay Area based parks while retaining a cohesive artistic vision. Near Chinatown in Oakland, he created a communal square for women's tai chi practice while adults and children gather year round to take advantage of their newly revived local park." He was the winner in 2010 of an international design competition to design the Solar Strand, a quarter-mile long solar-panel array, financed by the New York Power Authority, on the University at Buffalo's North Campus.

In 2013, Hood served as one of six selection committee members for the Rudy Bruner Award for Urban Excellence.

In 2014, Hood was commissioned by the Metro Nashville Arts Commission to create Witness Walls, a commemorative sculpture celebrating Nashville's civil rights history during the 1950s and 1960s. A public dedication event for the project, Nashville's first civil-rights inspired public art, was held April 21, 2017.

Awards and recognition 
In 1997, Hood was a fellow at the American Academy in Rome in Landscape Architecture. His work was featured in the 2006 exhibit "The Good Life: New Public Spaces for Recreation," at the Van Alen Institute in New York.
Hood was the 2009 recipient of the prestigious Cooper-Hewitt National Design Award for Landscape Design and has exhibited and lectured on his professional projects and theoretical works nationally and abroad. In 2018, The USC School of Architecture's American Academy in China (AAC) selected Hood as that year's research fellow. Hood is to design an installation to be executed using only local artisans and materials in Shanghai and Los Angeles; he will also give lectures in both cities.

Projects 

EPACenter Arts site design, East Palo Alto, CA, ongoing
Witness Walls, public art installation, Nashville, TN, 2017
International African American Museum Landscape Design, Charleston, SC, 2013–present
Foster Homestead and Burial Ground, South Lawn, University of Virginia, Charlottesville VA, 2008
Coleman Ave Gateway, San Jose International Airport, San Jose Public Art Program, 2007
West Oakland Historic Train Depot Plaza, Oakland CA, 2008
Phillip Lifeways Plan, Charleston, SC, Spoleto Art Program, 2006
Autry National Center Southwest Museum Landscape, Los Angeles CA, 2008
East Bay Waterfront Trail, Oakland, California, with EDAW and Associates, City of Oakland, California, 2002-
M. H. de Young Museum Landscape Design, Golden Gate Park, San Francisco, CA, with Herzog & de Meuron Architects, 2005
Lion Creek Crossing Park, Oakland, CA, EBALC, 2006
Macon Yards, Poplar Street, City of Macon, Georgia, 2005
Abraham Lincoln Brigade Memorial, w/ Ann Chamberlain, Embarcadero, San Francisco CA, 2007
Yerba Buena Lane, San Francisco, CA, with the Office of Cheryl Barton, 2005
Splash Pad Park Renovation and Streetscape Improvement Project, City of Oakland, California 2004

Awards 
Dorothy and Lillian Gish Award, 2019
MacArthur Fellowship: MacArthur Foundation, 2019
American Academy of Arts and Letters: Arts and Letters Award in Architecture, 2017
University at Buffalo School of Architecture and Planning: Dean's Medal, 2014
Cooper Hewitt, Smithsonian Design Museum National Design Award for Landscape Design, 2009
Virginia Key Beach Museum Competition, Miami Fl/1st Prize w/Huff and Gooden Architects 2005/Merit Award, ASLA, Northern Chapter
Oakland Waterfront 2005/Top Honor Award, Excellence on the Waterfront
Waterfront Center Award, Oakland Waterfront, October 2004/APWA 2004 Distinguished Project of the Year Award
Splash Pad Park/Mayor's Proclamation, "Walter Hood Day", Pioneering Achievements in Urban Landscape Design, City of Oakland, April 24, 2004/National Award of Honor American Society of Landscape Architecture, 2003
Project: Baldwin Hills Master Plan 2001/Best of the Best, California Park and Recreation Society 2002
Project: Lafayette Square Park/Merit Award, ASLA Southern California Chapter
Project: Baldwin Hills Master Plan 2001/Place Design Award, EDRA/Places, Third Annual Award 1999
Project: Lafayette Square Park. Poplar Street Civic Design Competition, First Prize. Macon, Georgia. Jan. 1998
Rome Prize in Landscape Architecture, The American Academy in Rome, 1996–1997.
"Urban Diaries" and "Jazz and Blues Landscape Improvisations," American Society of Landscape Architecture National Award of Merit: Research, 1994
Mount Vernon Riverfront Plan, Community Development Award State of Washington, 1988
Design Arts Competition, Merit Award, 1988
University of California Arboretum at Davis/ASLA Certificate For Excellence in the study of Landscape Design, 1987
Thomas Church Design Award for Excellence in Landscape Design/Department of Landscape Architecture at Berkeley, 1987

Publications 

 Design Culture Now, National Design Triennial, Princeton Architectural Press, NY, 2000
 Everyday Urbanism, Urban Diaries: Improvisation in West Oakland, CA. Monacelli Press, Inc., 1999. ISBN

References

External links 
 Hood Design Studio
 Walter J. Hood, UC Berkeley faculty

1958 births
Living people
African-American academics
African-American activists
20th-century American architects
American social activists
Urban designers
UC Berkeley College of Environmental Design faculty
UC Berkeley College of Environmental Design alumni
21st-century American architects
20th-century African-American artists
21st-century African-American artists